University of Business and Administration in Gdynia is a non-public business school in Gdynia, Poland.

Universities in Poland
Universities and colleges in Gdynia
Educational institutions established in 1994
1994 establishments in Poland